King Kong is the third studio album by American rapper Gorilla Zoe, released on June 14, 2011. The album debuted at #56 on the Billboard 200 with 10,300 copies in its first week out.

Track listing

References

2011 albums
Gorilla Zoe albums
Bad Boy Records albums
Albums produced by Drumma Boy
Albums produced by Lil Jon
Albums produced by Zaytoven
Albums produced by Sonny Digital